John Frayn Turner (9 August 1923 – 2 March 2015) was a British author specializing in military history.

Bibliography

References

1923 births
2015 deaths
British military writers